North Cariboo Air or North Cariboo Flying Services is an airline based in Alberta and British Columbia, Canada. It operates charter flights primarily for the oil and gas industry, as well as executive and general charter services, including sports teams and leisure groups both within and outside Canada. North Cariboo Air has a fleet of 18 aircraft registered with Transport Canada. These aircraft range in size from 9-100 seats, allowing for accommodating and adaptation of all project sizes. In addition NCFS offers private terminals in Calgary, Edmonton, Fort St. John, Vancouver and Prince George. The airline also offers cargo services, aerodrome management and fixed-base operator services.

History 
The story of North Cariboo Air starts in Williams Lake, British Columbia located in the North Cariboo region of British Columbia. Originally incorporated as North Cariboo Flying Service in 1957, the fleet consisted of a single Aeronca Champion aircraft that could carry one or two passengers to various locations throughout the interior of BC. Today, with a fleet of 18 aircraft, including the Avro RJ 100, NCFS has expanded include various destinations across Western Canada and the United States.

Fleet 
As of October 2020, the North Cariboo Air fleet registered with Transport Canada consists of the following:

Transport Canada lists a Beech Model 90, a Cessna 185 and a Beechcraft Baron all with cancelled certificates. There is also a Beechcraft King Air with a temporary cancelled certificate.

Gallery

References

External links 

North Cariboo Air

Regional airlines of Alberta
Air Transport Association of Canada
Airlines established in 1957